Bąków is a village in the administrative district of Gmina Kluczbork, within Kluczbork County, Opole Voivodeship, in south-western Poland.

The village has a population of 1,400.

Sights
Heritage sites of Bąków include the old wooden Church of the Assumption and a historic palace.

Transport
There is a train station in Bąków. The Polish National road 11 passes through the village.

Notable residents
 Eduard Georg von Bethusy-Huc (3 September 1829 – 19 November 1893), German politician
 Walter Scheunemann (26 March 1909 – 29 December 1949), German Wehrmacht officer
 Otto Hoffmann von Waldau (1898–1943), German Luftwaffe general

References

Villages in Kluczbork County